Sławomir Rutka (16 April 1975 – 22 February 2009) was a Polish footballer who played as a central defender.

Football career
Rutka was born in Jedlnia-Letnisko. During his 17-year senior career he represented Proch Pionki (1992–94, 2008–09), Radomiak Radom (1995), MG MZKS Kozienice (1995–97), Korona Kielce (1997–98, 2003–08), Legia Warsaw (1999), Widzew Łódź (2000, 2001–02), Ruch Radzionków (2000–01) and ŁKS Łódź (2002), appearing in a total of 69 Ekstraklasa games in representation of the fourth, fifth, sixth and seventh clubs.

In late February 2009, Rutka was found dead by his wife after having committed suicide. Already retired and coaching his first team Proch, he had been previously linked with a match fixing network, which had resulted in a two-year ban; he was 33 years old.

References

External links

1975 births
2009 deaths
People from Radom County
Sportspeople from Masovian Voivodeship
Polish footballers
Association football defenders
Ekstraklasa players
Radomiak Radom players
MG MZKS Kozienice players
Korona Kielce players
Legia Warsaw players
Widzew Łódź players
Ruch Radzionków players
ŁKS Łódź players
Suicides by hanging in Poland